Eirik Soltvedt (born 3 September 1979) is a retired Norwegian football striker.

Hailing from Randaberg, he played youth football for Viking and represented Norway as a youth international. He started his senior career in Bryne, but was not a squad member in 2000 and went to Randaberg; in mid-2000 he moved to Oslo and played successively for Skeid and Ullern. In 2002 he joined Ull/Kisa, and after 25 goals in the 2003 2. divisjon he was picked up by Lillestrøm. Never a success, in mid-2005 he moved on to Notodden. In mid-2007 he returned to Ull/Kisa, and from 2013 he finished his career in lowly Eidsvold and Hauerseter.

References

1979 births
Living people
Norwegian footballers
People from Randaberg
Bryne FK players
Randaberg IL players
Skeid Fotball players
Ullern IF players
Ullensaker/Kisa IL players
Lillestrøm SK players
Notodden FK players
Eliteserien players
Norwegian First Division players
Association football forwards
Norway youth international footballers
Sportspeople from Rogaland